Ricky John Henderson (born 11 September 1988) is a former Australian rules footballer who played for the Adelaide Football Club and the Hawthorn Football Club in the Australian Football League (AFL). Henderson was Adelaide's first selection in the 2009 rookie draft, taken at pick 10.

Early life
At the time of his drafting, Henderson had played only three games of Australian rules football in the previous four years, having played basketball locally in Ballarat. Before being drafted by Adelaide, Henderson supported .

AFL career
He went on to play out the season, kicking 13 goals in 12 games playing as a forward. At the end of the season he was promoted to the senior list. Henderson played 18 games in 2011 despite battling a hip injury late in the season.

In 2012 Henderson played 12 matches despite missing a period of the season with an ankle injury. He played 14 games in 2013, establishing himself in the Crows' side, particularly in defence, before a knee injury ended his season.

Henderson broke his leg in a training session in February 2014, ruling him out for most of the 2014 season. He returned in round 16 against  and played the last eight matches of the season, averaging 17 disposals. He also signed a two-year contract extension that would have kept him at the club until the end of 2017. Henderson played 17 games in 2015 and averaged a career-best 19 possessions, including being a key contributor to Adelaide's elimination final win with 29 possessions. At the conclusion of the 2016 season, he was delisted by Adelaide. He subsequently joined  as a delisted free agent. 

It took to the midpoint of the 2017 Home and Away season, that Henderson cemented his place in the team. His speed and long kicking has been invaluable as has his versatility that has deployed him at various times across half-back, through the midfield and up forward.  In several games Henderson has shown an ability to outrun his defender and get open goals at close range. Ricky's stats have also put him firmly among Hawthorn's top ten performers so far this season. Many of Henderson's stats place him in the top five on the team and he leads the club for average marks per game and is tied for third on the club for average disposals per game.

Personal life
Henderson is married to Jenny and has two children, daughter Rylee and son Billy.

Statistics

|- style=background:#EAEAEA
| 2009 ||  || 45
| 0 || — || — || — || — || — || — || — || — || — || — || — || — || — || — || 0
|- 
| 2010 ||  || 45
| 12 || 13 || 8 || 86 || 73 || 159 || 59 || 31 || 1.1 || 0.7 || 7.2 || 6.1 || 13.3 || 4.9 || 2.6 || 1
|- style=background:#EAEAEA
| 2011 ||  || 45
| 18 || 12 || 10 || 123 || 82 || 205 || 68 || 46 || 0.7 || 0.6 || 6.8 || 4.6 || 11.4 || 3.8 || 2.6 || 0
|-
| 2012 ||  || 45
| 12 || 9 || 2 || 99 || 53 || 152 || 54 || 11 || 0.8 || 0.2 || 8.3 || 4.4 || 12.7 || 4.5 || 0.9 || 2
|- style=background:#EAEAEA
| 2013 ||  || 45
| 14 || 5 || 5 || 188 || 82 || 270 || 85 || 26 || 0.4 || 0.4 || 13.4 || 5.9 || 19.3 || 6.1 || 1.9 || 3
|- 
| 2014 ||  || 45
| 8 || 0 || 2 || 91 || 44 || 135 || 37 || 7 || 0.0 || 0.3 || 11.4 || 5.5 || 16.9 || 4.6 || 0.9 || 0
|- style=background:#EAEAEA
| 2015 ||  || 45
| 17 || 3 || 2 || 202 || 131 || 333 || 90 || 23 || 0.2 || 0.1 || 11.9 || 7.7 || 19.6 || 5.3 || 1.4 || 0
|- 
| 2016 ||  || 45
| 9 || 1 || 3 || 114 || 85 || 199 || 54 || 12 || 0.1 || 0.3 || 12.7 || 9.4 || 22.1 || 6.0 || 1.3 || 0
|- style=background:#EAEAEA
| 2017 ||  || 31
| 18 || 13 || 9 || 217 || 172 || 389 || 119 || 38 || 0.7 || 0.5 || 12.1 || 9.6 || 21.6 || 6.6 || 2.1 || 3
|-
| 2018 ||  || 31
| 22 || 11 || 9 || 281 || 166 || 447 || 138 || 65 || 0.5 || 0.4 || 12.8 || 7.5 || 20.3 || 6.3 || 3.0 || 0
|- style=background:#EAEAEA
| 2019 ||  || 31
| 22 || 12 || 8 || 333 || 208 || 541 || 159 || 46 || 0.5 || 0.4 || 15.1 || 9.5 || 24.6 || 7.2 || 2.1 || 10
|-
| 2020 ||  || 31
| 7 || 0 || 0 || 55 || 50 || 105 || 37 || 11 || 0.0 || 0.0 || 7.9 || 7.1 || 15.0 || 5.3 || 1.6 || 0
|- class="sortbottom"
! colspan=3| Career
! 159 !! 79 !! 58 !! 1789 !! 1146 !! 2935 !! 900 !! 316 !! 0.5 !! 0.4 !! 11.3 !! 7.2 !! 18.5 !! 5.7 !! 2.0 !! 19
|}

Notes

Honours and achievements
Team
 Pre-season premiership player: 2012

References

External links

1988 births
Living people
Australian rules footballers from Victoria (Australia)
Adelaide Football Club players
Central District Football Club players
Place of birth missing (living people)
Adelaide Football Club (SANFL) players
Hawthorn Football Club players
Box Hill Football Club players